Frans Kapofi (born 25 January 1953) is a Namibian politician who since 1999 has served in various positions in cabinet.

A member of SWAPO,  he is a military officer by training. Kapofi has been a permanent secretary for various ministries of government since 1990. Thereafter he was appointed as cabinet secretary from 1999 to 2015. From 2015 to 2018 he served as Minister of Presidential Affairs. He was appointed Minister of Home Affairs in a cabinet reshuffle on 8 February 2018. Kapofi retained his portfolio after the 2019 Namibian general election; The ministry gained additionally the portfolio of safety and security in 2020. In a cabinet reshuffle in April 2021 he was moved to the Ministry of Defence and Veterans Affairs.

References

1953 births
Living people
People from Ohangwena Region
Members of the National Assembly (Namibia)
SWAPO politicians
Defence ministers of Namibia
Veteran affairs ministers of Namibia
Home affairs ministers of Namibia
Security ministers of Namibia